The 2010 Women's South American Volleyball Club Championship was the second official edition of the women's volleyball tournament, played by four teams over July 16–18, 2010 in Niño Héroe Manuel Bonilla Collisseum in Miraflores, Lima, Peru.

Competing clubs

Round-Robyn
The competition system for the tournament was a single Round-Robin system. Each team plays once against each of the 3 remaining teams. Points are accumulated during the whole tournament, and the final ranking is determined by the total points gained.

|}

Matches

|}

Final standing

Individual awards

Most Valuable Player
 Adenizia da Silva (Sollys/Osasco)
Best Spiker
 Natalia Pereira (Sollys/Osasco)
Best Blocker
 Jessenia Uceda (Géminis)
Best Server
 Sassá (Sollys/Osasco)

Best Digger
 Thais Barbosa (Sollys/Osasco)
Best Setter
 Carolina Albuquerque (Sollys/Osasco)
Best Receiver
 Daniela Gildenberger (Banco de la Nación)
Best Libero
 Camila Brait (Sollys/Osasco)

References

 Perú será sede del Sudamericano de Clubes Campeones (In Spanish)
 Copa Telefónica-Sudamericano de Clubes Campeones (In Spanish)

External links
 CSV Official Site

Women's South American Volleyball Club Championship
Women's South American Volleyball Club Championship
Voll
International volleyball competitions hosted by Peru